Ławki PGR is a settlement in the administrative district of Gmina Ryn, within Giżycko County, Warmian-Masurian Voivodeship, in northern Poland. 

References

Villages in Giżycko County